Daniel McKinney (9 November 1898 – 1956), also known as Dan McKinney and Danny McKinney, was an Irish international footballer who played professionally in England as a forward.

Career
Born in Belfast, McKinney began his career in his native Ireland with St Paul's Swifts and Belfast Celtic, before moving to England in 1920 to play in the Football League with Hull City, Bradford City and Norwich City. McKinney returned to Ireland to play with Bangor in 1926.

McKinney also represented Ireland at international level, earning 2 caps between 1921 and 1924.

Personal life
His two brothers Jack and Malachy were also footballers.

External links
NIFG

1898 births
1956 deaths
Association footballers from Northern Ireland
Pre-1950 IFA international footballers
Belfast Celtic F.C. players
Hull City A.F.C. players
Bradford City A.F.C. players
Norwich City F.C. players
Bangor F.C. players
English Football League players
Association footballers from Belfast
Association football forwards
Ireland (IFA) wartime international footballers